The Woman with a Broken Nose is a 2010 Serbian comedy film directed by Srđan Koljević.

Cast 
 Nebojša Glogovac as Gavrilo
 Anica Dobra as Anica
 Branka Katić as Biljana
 Jasna Žalica as Jadranka
 Nada Šargin as Jasmina
 Nikola Rakočević as Marko
 Vuk Kostić as Stefan
 Ljubomir Bandović as Taksista Rajko
 Stipe Erceg as Vuk
 Vojin Ćetković as Goran
 Bojan Dimitrijević as Pijanac iz dvorista
 Sena Đorović as Sankerka
 Rada Đuričin as Dragica
 Nikola Đuričko as Voditelj na radiju

References

External links 

2010 comedy films
2010 films
Films set in Serbia
Serbian comedy films
Films set in Belgrade